The Goldey–Beacom Lightning are the athletic teams that represent Goldey–Beacom College, located in Wilmington, Delaware, in intercollegiate sports. It is a member of the NCAA Division II ranks in all sports, primarily competing as a member of the Central Atlantic Collegiate Conference (CACC) since the 1999–2000 academic year.

Varsity teams
Goldey–Beacom competes in 13 intercollegiate varsity sports: Men's sports include baseball, basketball, cross country, golf, soccer and track & field; while women's sports include basketball, cross country, soccer, softball, tennis, volleyball and track & field.

Conference history

Associations
 National Association of Intercollegiate Athletics (1998–2002)
 National Collegiate Athletic Association (2002–present)

Conference
 Central Atlantic Collegiate Conference (1999–present)

References

External links
 

Goldey–Beacom College
College sports teams in Delaware
College sports teams in the United States by team
NCAA Division II teams
Sports in the Delaware Valley